Francis James Canova Jr. (born 23 December 1956) is an American electronics designer who originated the idea for the IBM Simon and has thus been described as the inventor of the smartphone.

Early life
Frank Canova was born in Wilmington, Delaware, raised in Green Cove Springs, Florida, and attended Clay High School, graduating in 1974. He received his advanced education at the Florida Institute of Technology, graduating with a BSc in electrical engineering in 1978.

Career

IBM
Canova was working at IBM when he realized that chip-and-wireless technology was small enough to use in a hand-held device. His boss, Jerry Merckel, was working on the development of PCMCIA cards that could be used to expand the memory of laptop computers and realized that they could also be used in the sort of device that Canova was thinking of. Both were working in a team that had been put together by Paul C. Mugge to enliven IBM's product range by developing smaller, lighter, products.

Merckel pitched the idea to Mugge of "the phone of the future" that would use cards inserted into the phone to run services, and the development of a prototype was approved by Mugge. It was decided by IBM to show the device, code named "Angler", at the November 1992 COMDEX technology trade show in Las Vegas, necessitating a rush to complete the prototype by Canova and his team that saw them working 80-hour weeks in order to have it ready.

The device was an immediate success at the show and Canova found himself on the front of the money section of USA Today, pictured holding the phone. It was released under the name Simon in August 1994 and patented by Canova and other team members in 1995 with a priority date of 13 November 1992. As the originator of the idea for the IBM Simon, Canova has been described as the inventor of the smartphone.

Palm
Canova joined Palm in January 1997 where he was head of engineering for the PalmPilot, Palm III, V, and VII series of PDAs and successor devices.

Other appointments
Canova has also held senior engineering positions at Plastic Logic, Neato Robotics, Livescribe, Reactrix Systems, Wheels of Zeus and Cirrus Logic.

References

External links
Francis J. Canova, Jr. Inventions, Patents and Patent Applications - Justia Patents Search

1956 births
Living people
American electronics engineers
IBM employees
Florida Institute of Technology alumni
People from Wilmington, Delaware
People from Green Cove Springs, Florida